Jean Dufour (5 April 1949 – 15 March 2020) was a French politician. He was a member of the French Communist Party. He served as a member of the National Assembly from 2001 to 2002, representing Bouches-du-Rhône's 4th constituency.

References

1949 births
2020 deaths
People from Cantal
Politicians from Auvergne-Rhône-Alpes
French Communist Party politicians
Deputies of the 11th National Assembly of the French Fifth Republic